The Sanford Residential Historic District is a U.S. Historic District (designated as such on December 15, 1989) located in Sanford, Florida. The district is bounded by Sanford Avenue, 14th Street, Elm Avenue, and 3rd Street. It contains 432 historic buildings, including the Old Fernald-Laughton Memorial Hospital and Sanford Grammar School.

References

External links

 Seminole County listings at National Register of Historic Places

Gallery

National Register of Historic Places in Seminole County, Florida
Historic districts on the National Register of Historic Places in Florida